Sunway Pyramid is a shopping mall located in Bandar Sunway, Subang Jaya, Selangor which was developed by Sunway Group.

History
The shopping mall was opened in July 1997. It underwent expansions in 2007 and then later again in 2015.

Architecture
Malaysia's first themed shopping and entertainment mall was constructed and designed in the Egyptian revival architectural style. The designs include a giant lion statue in the main entrance, several Pharaoh statues and two domes, known as the Orange and Blue atrium, which represents the Sun God Ra and the Great Nile river respectively.

The mall consists of several shopping precincts, which are Fashion Central, Oasis Boulevard, Asian Avenue and Marrakesh.

Mall zones

Asian Avenue
Oasis Boulevard
Fashion Central
Marrakesh
Orange Zone
Blue Zone
Green Zone
Red Zone
The Link

Access

Rail

The mall is connected to the  Sunway Lagoon BRT station by a pedestrian bridge and is nearby  Setia Jaya station or  USJ 7 station.

Rail connection to Sultan Abdul Aziz Shah Airport (Subang Skypark) is also possible through the  via  Subang Jaya station.

The mall and its surrounding areas were previously served by Sunway Monorail, which operated between the year 2000 until 2007.

RapidKL buses

Sunway Pyramid is accessible via the following rapidKL buses and is located at the entrance of the newly expanded Sunway Pyramid.
:  Pearl Point - Subang Parade via Jalan Klang Lama - Pearl Point
: Sunway Pyramid - Jalan Batu Tiga Lama, Klang - Sunway Pyramid
: Pasar Seni LRT - Mid Valley Megamall - USJ 8 Subang Jaya via Persiaran Kewajipan - Pasar Seni LRT
: Pasar Seni LRT - USJ 8 Subang Jaya via Subang Parade - Desa Mentari
: Kelana Jaya LRT - Sunway Pyramid - Subang Parade - Kelana Jaya LRT

Car
In 2007, a dedicated ramp from New Pantai Expressway to the mall's car park was constructed and is located in front of the mall. The intersection of the Kuala Lumpur–Port Klang highway Federal Route 2 and Damansara–Puchong Expressway lies nearby to the mall, along with an interchange with Shah Alam Expressway. The parking lot can accommodate 10,000 cars. The parking lot uses a ticketless and cashless parking system (Sunway Smart Parking, Sunway Pyramid parking rate).

Gallery

See also
 Egyptian Revival
 Sunway University
 Sunway Lagoon

References

1997 establishments in Malaysia
Shopping malls in Selangor
Shopping malls established in 1997
Pyramids in Asia
Subang Jaya
Sunway Group